Kanswa, also spelled Kansua, is a village in the Kota district of Rajasthan, India. It is of archaeological importance. It is the site where James Tod found an inscription in 1820 AD that reveals the rule of the Jat king Maharaja Shalinder in Kota region in 5th century AD. and Brahmin king Sankuka rule in 7th century whose son built the kansua Shiva Temple.

References 

Villages in Kota district